James Murphy (23 February 1880 – 18 July 1962) was a British long-distance runner. He competed in the men's 5 miles at the 1908 Summer Olympics.

References

1880 births
1962 deaths
Athletes (track and field) at the 1908 Summer Olympics
British male long-distance runners
Olympic athletes of Great Britain
Place of birth missing